A list of notable geographers and geologists from Slovenia:

Geographers
 Boštjan Burger
 Artur Gavazzi
 Peter Kozler (1824–1879)
 Anton Melik (1890–1966)
 Rajko Pavlovec (b. 1932)
 Franci Petek (b. 1971)
 Jože Velikonja (b. 1923)

Geologists
 Albert Heim
 Anton Ramovš

 
 
Geographer

sl:Seznam slovenskih geologov